An Experiment In Treason is the ninth historical mystery novel about Sir John Fielding by Bruce Alexander (a pseudonym for Bruce Cook).

Plot summary
A pack of confidential letters is stolen from the Secretary of State for the American Colonies.  With cross-Atlantic tensions rising, Sir John is ordered to interrogate the American representative in London, one Benjamin Franklin.

2002 American novels
Sir John Fielding series
G. P. Putnam's Sons books